Stig André van Eijk (born 21 March 1981) is a Norwegian singer and songwriter.

Career 

Van Eijk is known for his Eurovision participation. In 1999 he won Melodi Grand Prix with the song "Living My Life Without You" thus gaining right to represent Norway at Eurovision that year. On stage he had dancer and singer Belinda Braza. At the Eurovision itself, which was held in Israel, he ended in 14th place, gaining 35 points. He is the first ever black man to represent Norway.

The album, Where I Belong, which was released the same year, went platinum (over 30,000 copies) and reached number 6 on the VG-list Top 40 in Norway. In 2000, he was named this year's male artist (Hit awards). In 2001, Stig also made a peace song for his mother country, Colombia. The song, "Constructors of Peace", was recorded with the symphony orchestra of Bogota, and he went there, performing the song on different concerts and television shows.

In 2001 Van Eijk opened  «B: Underground Club» in Bergen. This club was a live concept with a house band playing reggae, soul and funk. In 2003, he made the song "Once In a Lifetime" that won "Idol" in South Africa, performed by Heinz Winckler. The song was a hit in South Africa and became double platinum (100,000 copies).

Stig van Eijk was a long time known as front figure in the reggae band "The Soul Express Orchestra". They released their debut album Time For A Change produced by Isak Strand at Knott Records in 2010. For the last couple of years he has also been working with music in a kindergarten, schools and other culturestages in Norway.

In 2013 Stig released his album "Presentation". The album's content reflects all of his influences from different genres experienced through his career, but with the main foundation of reggae and soul.

In 2015 Stig and his girlfriend, Beate Helen Thunes, released a new childrenproject called Trollala. Trollala has released music and had various performances around in Norway. Christmas performance "Trollala and Christmas that disappeared" have been played two years in Bergen.

He participated again in the Melodi Grand Prix 2023 with the song "Someday", but failed to qualify for the final.

Discography

Albums 
1999: Where I Belong (Mercury Records)
2013: Presentation (Nordic Records)

Singles 
 1999: Living My Life Without You 			
 1999:	Breakout					
 2002:	Growin´Pains					
 2002:	Once In a Lifetime				
 2007:	Constructors Of Peace			             
 2010:	Come						
 2010:	Beautiful feat. Cesca				
 2010:	En God Dag feat. Akeron			
 2010:	Beautiful feat. Cesca				
 2011:	Let's Make a Change feat. Beate H.Thunes	
 2011:	Live For Today feat. Kingsley Anowi		
 2012: Never Say Never				
 2013: Always A Solution
 2013: Down To Earth feat. Haisam			
 2013: No 1. feat DZ Dioniziz.				
 2014: Gonna make it feat KastAway (U.S)		
 2014: Ordinary Day					
 2016:	What she said feat Frank Nitt	(U.S)		
 2017:	Like a freak feat. 2ugly2hold			
 2017:	Without Faith feat. Nuno Barroso (Portugal)	
 2017:	Vinteren er kommet – Trollala               	             
 2017: Words unsaid feat KastAway (U.S)		
 2018: Faith in us					
 2018: Rainy Town feat. Black Ballroom                         
 2019: Ser på

Collaborations 
2010: The Soul Express Orchestra Time For A Change (Lill'-Bit Records)
2015: Trollala, den underlige vidunderlige (Good Vibes Entertainment)

References

External links 

Stig van Eijk at Nordic Records

1981 births
Living people
Colombian emigrants to Norway
Norwegian adoptees
Musicians from Bergen
Melodi Grand Prix contestants
Eurovision Song Contest entrants for Norway
Eurovision Song Contest entrants of 1999
Melodi Grand Prix winners
English-language singers from Norway
21st-century Norwegian singers
21st-century Norwegian male singers